The Memorial Necrópole Ecumênica is a Brazilian cemetery. Located in Santos, in the state of São Paulo, its construction began in 1983, and the first burial was on 28 July 1984.

Background
The cemetery is 14 stories high and occupies a total of 1.8 hectares of land and contains about 16,000 graves.

It received the Guinness World Records title for the tallest cemetery in the world.

Notable internments
Brazilian footballer Pelé was buried there on 3 January 2023.

References

External links
 
 

Cemeteries in Brazil
1984 establishments in Brazil